Oftedal is a surname. Notable people with the surname include:

Lars Oftedal Broch (born 1939), Norwegian judge
Kari Oftedal Lima (born 1943), Norwegian politician for the Socialist Left Party
Christian S. Oftedal (1907–1955), Norwegian politician for the Liberal Party
Hanna Bredal Oftedal (born 1994), Norwegian handball player
Lars Oftedal (1877–1932), the Norwegian Minister of Social Affairs and Minister of Trade
Lars Oftedal (born 1838) (1838–1900), Norwegian revivalist, priest, social reformer, politician, publicist and newspaper editor
Magne Oftedal (1921–1985), Norwegian linguist who researched Scottish Gaelic dialects, the Celtic languages and Spanish
Stine Bredal Oftedal (born 1991), Norwegian handball player
Sven Oftedal (1844–1911), Norwegian American Lutheran minister
Sven Oftedal (politician) (1905–1948), the Norwegian Minister of Social Affairs in 1945 and 1945–1948
Tor Oftedal (born 1925), Norwegian politician for the Labour Party
Alfred Oftedal Telhaug (1934–2016), Norwegian educationalist

See also
Oftel
Soft pedal